The  is a railway line in Shiga Prefecture, Japan, operated by the private railway operator Keihan Electric Railway.

Stations

History
The Otsu Railway opened the Hamaotsu to Awazu section in 1913, electrified at 600 V DC. The line was extended to Ishiyamadera (as single track) the following year.

The Hamaotsu to Miidera section opened in 1922 (dual track electrified), and in 1927 the company merged with a tourist boat operator to become the Biwako Railway & Steamship Co., which extended the line to Sakamoto the same year.

Keihan acquired the company in 1929 (and divested the steamship component immediately), connecting the line to its Keishin line in 1939.

The Awazu to Ishiyama section was double-tracked in 1943, but in 1945 the Sakamoto to Shigasato section was singled and the rails recycled for the Japanese war effort. The dual track was reinstated in 1947.

The voltage was increased to 1,500 V DC in conjunction with the voltage upgrade on the Keishin line.

References
This article incorporates material from the corresponding article in the Japanese Wikipedia.

Lines of Keihan Electric Railway
Ōtsu
Rail transport in Shiga Prefecture
Standard gauge railways in Japan
Railway lines opened in 1912
Street running
1912 establishments in Japan
1500 V DC railway electrification